The Green Line (Line 5) is a metro rail line of the Delhi Metro, a rapid transit system in Delhi, India. The line consists of 24 stations covering a total length of 28.79  km. It runs between Inderlok and Brigadier Hoshiyar Singh with a branch line connecting the line's Ashok Park Main station with Kirti Nagar station.

It is a completely elevated line and runs mostly along the busy NH 9 route in North Delhi and North West Delhi, bypassing Tikri Border to enter Bahadurgarh. It is the first Delhi metro line on standard gauge, as opposed to  broad gauge, prevalent in Red, Yellow and Blue Lines.

History
The line was opened in two stages, with the 15.1 km Inderlok – Mundka section opening on 3 April 2010 and the 3.5 km Kirti Nagar – Ashok Park Main branch line on 27 August 2011. Though its route is shorter than other lines, the Green Line serves as a lifeline for Delhiites going to and coming from Red and Blue Lines, as it covers major commercial and residential areas like Punjabi Bagh, Paschim Vihar, Nangloi and Mundka.

On 6 August 2012, in a step that will improve commuting in National Capital Region, the Union government approved the extension of Delhi Metro from Mundka to Bahadurgarh in Haryana. The 11.18 km metro stretch comprises seven stations with four of them in Delhi and the remaining three in Bahadurgarh -- Mundka Industrial Area, Ghevra, Tikri Kalan, Tikri Border, Pandit Shree Ram Sharma (Modern Industrial Estate), Bahadurgarh City (Bus Stand) and Brigadier Hoshiar Singh (City Park). 

Construction work of this extension began in 2013 and was completed by the second half of 2018, as part of the Phase III expansion. Prime Minister Narendra Modi inaugurated the Mundka – Bahadurgarh stretch via video conferencing on 24 June 2018.

In late October 2019, it was decided to construct steel platforms on the viaduct of Green Line between Punjabi Bagh and Shivaji Park stations that will provide a seamless interchange between Green Line and Pink Line. Construction began in that year itself and the new halt platform of Green Line, named Punjabi Bagh West, was thrown open to the public on 29 March 2022, after multiple delays.

The new halt platform of Green Line is connected by a Foot Over Bridge (FOB), which links with the Punjabi Bagh West station of the Pink Line. The FOB is 212 metres long. The new platforms are 155 metres in length and are connected with the FOB by two extra-large lifts on each platform with a capacity of 26 passengers each as well as staircases.

Stations

Main Line

Branch Line

Train Info

Infrastructure 

Green Line is equipped with Bombardier Cityflo 350 signalling.

Rolling stock

The Green Line uses standard gauge trains manufactured by a consortium of Mitsubishi, Hyundai Rotem and Bharat Earth Movers (BEML). A total of 196 cars for the Green Line and the Violet Line were ordered for both 4-car configurations (46 trains) and 6-car configurations (2 trains).  One train was manufactured in Changwon in South Korea and rest of the trains were manufactured at BEML's facility in Bangalore. Width of these trains is 2.9 meters as compared to 3.2 meters on broad gauge trains.

See also
 Transport in Delhi
 Delhi Suburban Railway
 National Capital Region Transport Corporation
 Rapid transit in India
 List of rapid transit systems
 List of metro systems

References

External links

 Delhi Metro Rail Corporation Ltd. (Official site)
 Delhi Metro Annual Reports

Railway lines opened in 2010
Delhi Metro lines